Semioptila stenopteryx is a moth in the Himantopteridae family. It was described by Erich Martin Hering in 1932. It is found in Katanga Province in the Democratic Republic of the Congo.

References

Moths described in 1932
Himantopteridae
Endemic fauna of the Democratic Republic of the Congo